Maurice "Mocky" Patrick Brereton is a New Zealand former professional rugby league footballer who represented New Zealand in the 1970 and 1972 World Cups and one match in the 1975 World Championship Series.

Playing career
Brereton was originally from the West Coast. He was educated at Marist Brothers High School, Greymouth. and made his New Zealand national rugby league team debut in 1969 while playing for the Greymouth Marist club.

Brereton then moved to Christchurch, joining the Marist-Western Suburbs club in the Canterbury Rugby League competition in 1970. He was part of the 1970 and 1972 World Cup Squads. In 1975 he played one match in the World Championship Series but was not selected for the squad for the October finals. Instead he played for Canterbury in the side that defeated Auckland in the New Zealand Rugby League final. Brereton played in 24 tests and scored 25 tries in 50 matches for the Kiwis. Brereton also represented the South Island, Southern Zone, New Zealand Marist and Rest of New Zealand.

Brereton's 46 tries for Canterbury is a district record, as is his 156 tries for Marist-Western Suburbs.

Later years
Brereton coached Marist-Western Suburbs in 1977 and was elected the club president of the Marist-Western Suburbs club in 1985.

Personal life
Brereton was a Police detective from his playing days until his retirement in 1995, after 25 years in the force. In 1971 he was the New Zealand Police's "Sportsman of the Year". In 2006 it was announced he was suffering from Parkinson's disease. He works as the publican at the Ashley Hotel.

References

Living people
New Zealand rugby league players
New Zealand national rugby league team players
West Coast rugby league team players
Canterbury rugby league team players
New Zealand police officers
People with Parkinson's disease
Bartenders
New Zealand rugby league administrators
Marist-Western Suburbs players
South Island rugby league team players
New Zealand rugby league coaches
Marist (West Coast) players
Rugby league centres
Rugby league wingers
Year of birth missing (living people)
People educated at John Paul II High School, Greymouth